Pekua is an upazila, or sub-district, of Cox's Bazar District in Chittagong Division, Bangladesh.

Administration
Pekua Upazila is divided into seven union parishads: Barabakia, Magnama, Pekua, Rajakhali, Shilkhali, Taitong, and Ujantia. The union parishads are subdivided into 12 mauzas and 125 villages.

References 

Upazilas of Cox's Bazar District